Andrej Janež is a Slovenian diabetologist and diabetes researcher. Janež is the Head of Department of Endocrinology, Diabetes and Metabolic Disease at University Medical Centre Ljubljana, Assistant Professor for Internal Medicine at the Medical University Ljubljana, Chairman of the Advances in Diabetes and Insulin Therapy conference, member of the advisory board for peroral antidiabetic therapy in Servier Pharma, member for Slovenia in the Diabetes Education Study Group at European Association for the Study of Diabetes, and member of the European advisory board for continuous glucose monitoring system in development for Lifescan.

Janež authored numerous articles on diabetology and indexed by Science Citation Index, co-edited a clinical manual on continuous subcutaneous insulin infusion therapy, or insulin pump treatment. The latter is also the best known area of Janež's scientific work, as he introduced insulin pump treatment to India, Turkey, China, Slovenia, and several other countries, where he also led the effort of educating teams of diabetologists required for a continuous application of the technique.

Education
MD, 1996, School of Medicine, University of Ljubljana
MS, 1998, School of Medicine, University of Ljubljana with thesis "Effects of chromium on blood pressure in humans"
PhD, 2000, Diabetology School of Medicine, University of California, San Diego, with thesis Mechanism of glucose transport in insulin resistant 3T3-L1 adipocytes
Post doctoral, 2005, Joslin Diabetes Clinic, Boston, study on insulin pump therapy in type 1 diabetic patients

Work

Upon his return from the U.S., Janež introduced the insulin pump method into clinical practice of treating adult patients with type 1 diabetes in Slovenia. Together with his colleagues from the Department of Endocrinology, Diabetes, and Metabolic Disease at University Medical Centre Ljubljana, Janež co-authored the algorithm used in insulin pump treatment, as well as tutored virtually all Slovenian diabetologists in usage of both insulin pump and glucose sensor. Janež also wrote all of the literature on subjects of functional insulin therapy and insulin pump in Slovenia, with its audiences ranging from diabetologists to patients. In 2008, he established a new unit for functional insulin therapy within the University Medical Centre.

Janež also led the effort of forming international standards for interpretation of results obtained with glucose sensor, publishing and presenting these on several international diabetes-related symposiums.

Coupled with his previous work in the field of functional insulin therapy and its pilot implementation in Slovenia, Janež went on to introduce this approach to diabetes treatment in other countries.

Publications

References

External links
3rd International Conference on Advances in Diabetes and Insulin Therapy

Living people
University of Ljubljana alumni
University of California, San Diego alumni
Academic staff of the University of Ljubljana
Slovenian diabetologists
Year of birth missing (living people)